Eleutherodactylus casparii is a species of frog in the family Eleutherodactylidae endemic to Sierra de Trinidad, Cienfuegos Province, Cuba. Its natural habitat is mesic forest, but it also occurs in anthropogenic habitats such as plantations and in introduced vegetation. It is threatened by habitat loss.

References

casparii
Amphibians described in 1926
Endemic fauna of Cuba
Amphibians of Cuba
Taxonomy articles created by Polbot